Mehmet Sait Halet Efendi (1761–1822) was an Ottoman diplomat and politician, ambassador to Paris from 1803 to 1806 and later the favourite and Inner Minister of the sultan Mahmud II. He was ambassador to the court of Napoleon I until 1806, and was succeeded in this role by Muhib Efendi, who was ambassador from 1806 to 1811.

In 1819, Halet Efendi brought the attention of Sultan Mahmud II to the power-grabbing activities of Ali Pasha in Ottoman Europe. As Mahmud II sent an army against Ali Pasha, the latter responded by encouraging a rebellion against Ottoman power in Greece. These event led to the catastrophic Greek insurrection in 1821. Considered by the Sultan as contributing to the rebellion, Halet was banished from the court before being assassinated in Konya, present-day Turkey, in November 1822. He was strangled and beheaded.

See also
 Franco-Ottoman alliance

Notes

References
 Inari Karsh, Empires of the Sand: The Struggle for Mastery in the Middle East, 1789-1923, Harvard University Press, 2001 
 Agnes Mongan, Miriam Stewart, Fogg Art Museum, David to Corot: French drawings in the Fogg Art Museum, Harvard University Press, 1996 
Henri Tonnet, « Constantinople dans quelques textes grecs de fiction aux XVIIIe et XIXe siècles  », Cahiers balkaniques, 36-37 | 2008, 321–328.

Ambassadors of the Ottoman Empire to France
1761 births
1822 deaths
19th-century people from the Ottoman Empire
19th-century diplomats
Executed people from the Ottoman Empire
19th-century executions by the Ottoman Empire